, formerly known as Ezaki Productions, is a Japanese talent management agency representing a number of prolific voice actors.

Attached voice actors
Male
 Yousuke Akimoto
 Shinya Fukumatsu
 Kenji Hamada
 Takanobu Hozumi
 Mitsuhiro Ichiki
 Atsushi Imaruoka
 Kentarō Itō
 Kengo Kawanishi
 Ryūichi Kijima
 Yasumichi Kushida
 Naomi Kusumi
 Junpei Morita
 Toshihiro Nakamura
 Mitsuru Ogata
 Tōru Ōkawa
 Akio Ōtsuka
 Yuta Sato
 Tarusuke Shingaki
 Atsushi Tamaru
 Masaki Terasoma

Female
 Nozomi Furuki
 Sawako Hata
 Kyoko Hikami
 Masayo Hosono
 Hiromi Igarashi
 Ai Kakuma
 Yoshiko Kamei
 Ayumi Kida
 Sachiko Kojima
 Naoko Kouda
 Yūki Kuwahara
 Yuki Masuda
 Nanako Mori
 Michiyo Murase
 Ayuru Ōhashi
 Akemi Okamura
 Yūko Ōno
 Ikue Ōtani
 Yōko Sōmi
 Riho Sugiyama
 Yūki Takada
 Atsuko Tanaka
 Ikuko Tani
 Asuka Tanii
 Risa Tsubaki
 Ayumi Tsuji
 Seiko Yoshida
 Suzuka Morita

Formerly attached voice actors
Male
 Daisuke Gori (died two years after being transferred at Aoni Production)
 Mitsuaki Hoshino (attached with Arts Vision)
 Yoshimasa Hosoya (on freelance now)
 Atsushi Ii (attached with Arts Vision)
 Akira Ishida (attached with Peerless Gerbera)
 Makoto Ishii (attached with Remax)
 Yasuo Iwata (deceased)
 Yasuyuki Kase (attached with Office Osawa)
 Masayuki Kato (deceased)
 Yuuji Kishi (attached with CUBCE Inc.)
 Koichi Kitamura (deceased)
 Takaya Kuroda (attached with AXL-One)
 Mitsuaki Madono (attached with Aoni Production)
 Rokuro Naya (deceased)
 Tamio Ohki (deceased)
 Daisuke Ono (on freelance now)
 Shuuhei Sakaguchi (attached with Aksent)
 Shunsuke Shima (deceased)
 Toshitaka Shimizu (deceased)
 Masakazu Suzuki (attached with Aksent)
 Akimitsu Takase (attached with Aksent)
 Hideyuki Tanaka (attached with Aoni Production)
 Tomohiro Tsuboi (attached with 81 Produce)
 Masaaki Tsukada (deceased)
 Yōji Ueda (attached with Amuleto)
 Hideo Watanabe (attached with Libertad)
 Naoki Yanagi (attached with FreeMarch.inc)

Female
 Kiyomi Asai (attached with Dee Color)
 Kikuko Inoue (attached with Velvet as a narrator and Office Anemone as a voice actress)
 Ayako Ito
 Hitomi Hase (on freelance now)
 Marika Kouno (attached with Aoni Production)
 Tomoyo Kurosawa (attached with Toho Geino)
 Nozomi Nishida (on freelance now)
 Miyuki Sawashiro (attached with Aoni Production)
 Saori Seto (on freelance now)
 Ayano Yamamoto (attached with Amuleto)

Mausu Promotion-influenced works
 Boktai: The Sun Is in Your Hand
 Eureka Seven
 Heartwork: Symphony of Destruction
 Juuni Senshi Bakuretsu Eto Ranger
 Kannazuki no Miko
 Rakugo Tennyo Oyui
 Star Trek: The Next Generation (Japanese dub)
 xxxHolic

External links
  

Japanese voice actor management companies
Mass media in Tokyo